Cathedral Parkway–110th Street may refer to:
 Cathedral Parkway–110th Street (IND Eighth Avenue Line)
 Cathedral Parkway–110th Street (IRT Broadway–Seventh Avenue Line)